Lycodon jara, commonly known as the twin-spotted wolf snake, is a species of colubrid snake. It is endemic to Asia.

Distribution
 
Found in Bangladesh, India (Assam, Odisha, Arunachal Pradesh, Manipur, West Bengal and parts of Uttar Pradesh) and Nepal.

Description
Snout much depressed; eye rather small. Rostral much broader than long, just visible from above; internasals much shorter than the prefrontals; frontal as long as or a little shorter than its distance from the end of the snout, a little shorter than the parietals; loreal elongate, not entering the eye; one pre-ocular; two post-oculars; temporals small, 1 + 2; 9 or 10 upper labials, third, fourth, and fifth entering the eye; 4 or 5 lower labials in contact with the anterior chin-shields, which are longer than the posterior.

Dorsal scales smooth, in 17 rows. Ventrals 167–175, not angulate laterally; anal divided; subcaudals 56–63, in two rows.

Coloration in alcohol (for preserved specimens): brown above, each scale with two white dots or short longitudinal lines; labials white; usually a white collar; lower surface uniform white.

Total length 35 cm (13 inches); tail 6 cm (2 inches).

Gallery

References

Other references
 Lanza, B. 1999 A new species of Lycodon from the Philippines, with a key to the genus (Reptilia: Serpentes: Colubridae). Tropical Zoology 12: 89-104

jara
Reptiles of Bangladesh
Reptiles of India
Reptiles of Nepal
Reptiles described in 1802